Cory Miguel James (born May 22, 1993) is an American football linebacker for the Calgary Stampeders of the Canadian Football League (CFL). He played college football at Colorado State, and was drafted by the Oakland Raiders in the sixth round of the 2016 NFL Draft.

High school career 
James attended Del Rio High School, in Del Rio, Texas where he lettered twice in football. As a junior in 2009, he started all 13 games. As a senior in 2010, he started the first eight games before suffering a torn left anterior cruciate ligament (ACL). Before suffering the injury, he had recorded, combined as a junior and senior, 116 tackles, 26 tackles-for-loss, 11 sacks, three forced fumbles and one fumble recovery. Despite his injury, James was voted the District 29-5A Co-Linebacker of the Year as well as First-team All-District for the second consecutive year.

While at Del Rio High School, James also played on the schools baseball team. As a football player, he was recruited by TCU, New Mexico, Colorado, Texas State, Louisiana Tech and East Carolina Pirates football.

College career 
James then attended Colorado State where he majored in liberal arts.

In 2011, he redshirted, granting him a fifth year of eligibility. In 2012 as a redshirt freshman, he set a school record with 7.5 sacks. He finished the season with 54 tackles (26 solo) and 10.5 tackles-for-loss. He earned freshman All-America honors from the Football Writers Association of America and College Football News (Second-team), as well as Second-team national All-Freshman and Season team All-Mountain West by Phil Steele.

In 2013 as a redshirt sophomore, James started 13 games. He recorded 60 tackles (29 solo), eight sacks, 12 tackles-for-loss, one pass broken up, two forced fumbles and five quarterback hurries. In 2014 as a redshirt junior, appeared in all 13 games with 12 starts. He recorded 51 tackles (29 solo), a team leading 8.5 tackles-for-loss, 6.5 sacks, three quarterback hurries and once forced fumble. In 2015 as a redshirt senior, he appeared in all 13 games, starting 12. He recorded 65 tackles (28 solo), two sacks and 10 tackles-for-loss.

Career statistics

Professional career

Oakland Raiders 
James was drafted by the Oakland Raiders in the sixth round (194th overall) of the 2016 NFL Draft. On May 20, 2016, he signed a four-year contract worth $2,472,480, including a $132,480 signing bonus. He played in all 16 games with five starts, recording 48 tackles and one forced fumble.

James entered the 2017 season as one of the Raiders' starting outside linebackers. He started nine out of ten games played while dealing with a knee injury throughout the season. He missed two straight games before being placed on injured reserve on December 13, 2017 with the knee injury.

On May 4, 2018, James was waived by the Raiders with a failed physical designation.

Calgary Stampeders 
James signed with the Calgary Stampeders of the CFL on March 31, 2020.

Personal life 
Cory James is the son of Clarence and Sheila James. He also has one older brother, Zachary James. While in college, James volunteered with the Boys & Girls Clubs of America in Larimer County, Colorado.

References

External links 
 Colorado State Rams bio
 Oakland Raiders bio

1993 births
Living people
Players of American football from Texas
People from Del Rio, Texas
American football linebackers
Colorado State Rams football players
Oakland Raiders players
Calgary Stampeders players